McEntire is a surname. Notable people with the surname include:
Harry McEntire (born 1990), British actor
John McEntire (born 1970), American recording engineer, drummer and multi-instrumentalist
Pake McEntire (born 1953), American country music artist and older brother of Reba McEntire
Reba McEntire (born 1955), American country music artist, nicknamed "The Queen of Country"

See also
McEntire Joint National Guard Base, military airport in Richland County, South Carolina, United States
Rhea-McEntire House, historic antebellum mansion on the shoreline of the Tennessee River's Wheeler Lake in Decatur, Alabama